Tropical Cyclone Hollanda was the worst tropical cyclone in Mauritius in 19 years. It formed on 6 February 1994, in the central Indian Ocean in the Southern Hemisphere. The cyclone moved southwestward for much of its duration, striking Mauritius on 10 February at peak intensity with winds of 218 km/h (135 mph). It later passed just southeast of Réunion before turning to the south and weakening. The cyclone became extratropical on 14 February in the southern Indian Ocean.

In Mauritius, Hollanda destroyed or severely damaged 450 houses, which left at least 1,500 people homeless. High winds left half of the island without power, and also caused severe crop damage; nearly half of the island's sugar crop was destroyed, which necessitated for the government to assist in replanting efforts. Hollanda killed 2 people and caused $135 million in damage on Mauritius. About a week after the cyclone struck, Cyclone Ivy also affected the area, although to a lesser degree. The highest rainfall from the cyclone fell on Réunion, with  recorded at Grand Coude.

Meteorological history

Based on analysis from Météo-France (MFR), a disturbance in the Indian Ocean Intertropical Convergence Zone became evident south of the Chagos Archipelago on 6 February, after Cyclone Geralda struck Madagascar and moved away from the region. The Joint Typhoon Warning Center (JTWC) assessed it as developing a day prior in the same general area. Later that day, a circulation developed concurrently with an area of organized convection. On 8 February, the system intensified into Tropical Storm Hollanda as it moved southwestward, its motion influenced by a ridge to its south. A trough turned the storm to the south-southwest, and Hollanda intensified into a tropical cyclone – the equivalent of a hurricane – on 9 February.

After becoming a tropical cyclone, Hollanda developed a small  eye as it tracked toward the island of Mauritius, located east of Madagascar. While moving over Mauritius, the eye became disrupted, although Hollanda maintained much of its intensity as it passed just southeast of Réunion early on 11 February. The cyclone remained well-defined as it moved more poleward, and an irregular eye remained visible on satellite imagery. On 13 February, Hollanda turned eastward due to a trough, and the next day it became extratropical over the southern Indian Ocean. Its remnants persisted at least two more days.

Impact
Before Hollanda struck Mauritius, most people were already residing at home, due to the cyclone striking during the Chinese New Year. Officials closed the airport prior to the cyclone's arrival, and most stores and banks were also closed. Officials also ordered for cars to be off the roads during the storm and for people to remain indoors. Forecasters initially expected the storm would remain slightly offshore.

Strong winds affected the northern and western portions of the island, particularly near the coast, and the cyclone was considered the worst to hit there since Cyclone Gervaise in 1975. In addition to the winds, the storm dropped torrential rainfall that reached  in Mare aux Vacoas. Across the island, Hollanda destroyed 290 houses and severely damaged another 160, which left at least 1,500 people homeless. Included among the damaged buildings was the Russian embassy, which faced such difficulties making repairs that the ambassadors moved their offices. Damage to schools was estimated at 25 million rupees ($1.3 million 1994 USD), causing some to be closed for as long as 12 days. High winds downed 30% of the island's trees. Many fell onto power lines, which left 60% of Mauritians without power and about half without telephone service. All external communications were cut to the country during the cyclone. In addition, nearly half of the sugar plantations were destroyed, although the primary industry of tourism was not significantly affected. In total, the cyclone killed two people, and left $135 million in damage (1994 USD); the total included lost productivity, such as decreased sugar output. Less than a week after Hollanda struck, Cyclone Ivy also hit Mauritius, although to a lesser extent than Hollanda. The combined impact caused most roads to be blocked by either fallen trees or mudslides; all main roads were quickly restored.

Following the storm's passage, the Mauritius government opened 130 shelters, and also provided 5,000 rupees to each homeless family. The crop damage from Hollanda, in addition to a drought, decreased the following year's output by 22%. In response, the government provided seeds to farmers so they could replant their crops. Most of the island had their power restored by ten days after the storm. The country's prime minister issued an appeal to the European Union for 67 million rupees ($3.6 million 1994 USD) in assistance, although later dropped it to less than half that total. The requested aid was for the restoration of phone and power utilities. The storm's severe impact on Mauritius caused a sharp drop in the country's gross domestic product (GDP) per capita, and the overall GDP decreased by 10%.

The cyclone left damage to crops, power systems, telephones, and the water network, mostly due to the strong winds.

See also

Tropical cyclones in the Mascarene Islands
1892 Mauritius cyclone – powerful cyclone that largely destroyed Mauritius
Cyclone Dina – strong cyclone in 2002 that also affected Mauritius

References

External links
Joint Typhoon Warning Center (JTWC) .
Météo France (RSMC La Réunion).
World Meteorological Organization

1993–94 South-West Indian Ocean cyclone season
South-West Indian Ocean tropical cyclones
Tropical cyclones in the Mascarene Islands